Brushy Peak, also known as Brushy Knob or Las Cuevas (The Caves), is a summit in Alameda County, California that overlooks the Livermore Valley. North of the valley, it is part of the Diablo Range.

Historically, the peak and its immediate surroundings were used for some outdoor events, like picnics.

References 

Mountains of Alameda County, California
Diablo Range